Markus Erdmann (born 16 July 1969) is a German former professional footballer who played as a striker.

References

External links

1969 births
Living people
German footballers
Association football forwards
Hannover 96 players
2. Bundesliga players